Smaldone is a surname. Notable people with the surname include:

Filippo Smaldone (1848–1923), Italian priest
Hugo Smaldone, Argentine footballer
Micah Smaldone, American musician
Valerie Smaldone, American media personality
William Smaldone, American historian
Smaldone crime family